124 Horseferry Road is the headquarters for the British television broadcaster, Channel 4. It is located in the City of Westminster, London and includes 100 residential apartments. The building was opened on 6 July 1994 and was designed by Richard Rogers and Partners.

Design and construction

After a selection process during the autumn of 1990, Channel 4 invited three architectural firms to take part in a competition to design their  headquarters building on the south-eastern corner of Chadwick Street and Horseferry Road in a mixed development area of Westminster. The architectural brief also incorporated a requirement for a residential development of two blocks of flats including 100 apartments, an underground car park and a small public landscaped park. The three firms chosen were Bennetts Associates, Richard Rogers and Partners and James Stirling.

The Richard Rogers Partnership was chosen from the shortlist. This was the first major building that they had designed since the Lloyd's building (1978-1986). Construction of the building began in 1990 and was completed in 1994. It was built on a design and build basis. The building consists of two four-storey office blocks that are connected to a central entrance block in an L shape. The entrance has a concave glazed wall. The building is finished in grey steel cladding, which is perforated by red-ochre steel struts. John Young, the project architect, said that the colour was "taken from a paint sample provided by the City of San Francisco: it is the same colour as the Golden Gate Bridge".

See also
Big 4 (sculpture)

Awards and nominations

 1995 RIBA National Award
 1995 Royal Fine Art Commission Award
 1996 BBC Design Awards Finalist

References

External links
 

Richard Rogers buildings
Channel 4
Office buildings completed in 1994
Buildings and structures in the City of Westminster
1994 establishments in England